The Pacemaker name was applied to a number of related Bellanca aircraft in the 1920s and 1930s:

 Bellanca CH-200 Pacemaker
 Bellanca CH-300 Pacemaker
 Bellanca 31-40 and 31-42 Pacemaker Senior
 Bellanca 300W Pacemaker
 Bellanca E Pacemaker